Buathip na Chiengmai, is the second child and only daughter of Kaeo Nawarat and Chamariwong of Chiang Mai.

Biography 
Buathip is the second child and only daughter of Kaeo Nawarat and Chamariwong of Chiang Mai. She has two full siblings, Sukkasem na Chiengmai, Prince Uttarakan Koson and Wongtawan na Chiengmai, Prince Ratchabut.

Buathip was married to Second Lieutenant Prince Kui Sirorasa and divorced. They have a daughter, Princess Soidara Sirorasa. Buathip married Mueangchuen na Chiengmai, Prince Ratchaphakhinai. Buathip has no children by Mueangchuen.

In 1931, she interests the Fon lep dance and training girls in the royal court for show.

References

Year of birth missing
Year of death missing
Buathip na Chiengmai
Buathip na Chiengmai